Little Cranberry Lake may refer to:

 Canada
 Little Cranberry Lake (Annapolis)
 Little Cranberry Lake (Digby)
 Little Cranberry Lake (Halifax)
 United States
 Little Cranberry Lake, Washington